Botrychium lanceolatum is a species of plant belonging to the family Ophioglossaceae.

Its native range is subarctic and temperate Northern Hemisphere including Greenland.

References

Ophioglossaceae
Flora of Greenland